Sibovia occatoria, the Yellow-striped Leafhopper, is a species of sharpshooter native to North and Central America, from the United States to El Salvador in the family Cicadellidae.

References

Further reading

External links

 

Insects described in 1830
Cicadellini